The 12th International 500-Mile Sweepstakes Race was held at the Indianapolis Motor Speedway on Friday, May 30, 1924.

Lora Lawrence Corum started the race in the #15 entry, and was relieved during the race by Joe Boyer. Boyer proceeded to drive the car to victory, and both drivers were credited as "co-winners" for the 1924 race.

Boyer led the first lap of the race in his original #9 entry. After Boyer got out of the car and took over the #15, the #9 entry continued in the race, taken over by Ernie Ansterburg, Corum, and later Thane Houser. Houser crashed the car after 176 laps, and Boyer's original car was credited with 18th place.

Time trials
Four-lap (10 mile) qualifying runs were utilized. Jimmy Murphy won the pole position with a speed of over 108mph.

Race summary and results

After Joe Boyer, in his original car, led the first lap, Jimmy Murphy took the lead. By half-distance, Murphy led while Earl Cooper held 2nd. Fred Duesenberg, incensed that his lead car was behind four Miller vehicles, called Boyer into the pits, as his car had fallen behind with unscheduled pit stops. He then waved in his 5th-place car, driven by L.L. Corum, and installed Boyer in it. Duesenberg reportedly told him, "Catch them," referring to the Millers, "or burn this ship!"

Boyer re-entered the race with Corum's car and soon passed Bennett Hill and Harry Hartz. With 40 laps to go, he was about 1 mile behind leader Jimmy Murphy and Earl Cooper, turning laps at up to 104 mph.

Murphy was signaled that Boyer was rapidly closing and upped his pace, but he soon cut a tire and had to pit. Cooper assumed the lead but suffered the same fate after pushing harder. Cooper sped out of the pits and closed on Boyer. With 12 laps to go, Cooper made a passing attempt in turn 1, but skidded and again cut a tire, prompting another pit stop. Boyer then eased his pace to win the 500 with a record average speed of over 98 mph.

Race details
For 1924, riding mechanics were optional, however, no teams utilized them.
First alternate: none

Eddie Hearne was the lone entry in the race who competed in the inaugural Indy 500

References

Indianapolis 500 races
Indianapolis 500
Indianapolis 500
Indianapolis 500
Indianapolis 500